No. 23 Squadron  (Panthers) is a fighter squadron and is equipped with MiG-21Bison and based at Suratgarh Air Force Station.

History

The squadron was raised in the year 1956 and it became the first squadron in Indian Air Force to be commissioned with Folland Gnat.

Assignments
Indo-Pakistani War of 1965
Indo-Pakistani War of 1971

Aircraft

References

023